Beauty and the Geek is an American reality television series that premiered on The WB on June 1, 2005. It has been advertised as "The Ultimate Social Experiment" and is produced by Ashton Kutcher, Jason Goldberg and J.D. Roth. The show's title is a parody of Beauty and the Beast. This was the first show produced by the Fox Television Studios sub-division Fox 21.

The show follows groups of "Beauties" (people — almost always women — who rely on their attractiveness and outgoing personalities but typically lack intellect) and "Geeks" (people — almost always men — who rely on their intellect, but typically lack social ability) who must pair up to compete in challenges to avoid elimination. The final pair remaining is declared as being "More than just a Beauty and a Geek" and wins the grand prize of $250,000.

While a competition, the show is also billed as a social experiment, in which each contestant typically learns from their teammate. During the competition, the contestants live in a mansion and compete in a series of challenges, with the beauties competing in challenges of intellect, and the geeks competing in challenges involving social ability.

Production 
The theme song, "Opportunities (Let's Make Lots of Money)" by the Pet Shop Boys (originally released in 1985), is used also on the British, Danish and Belgian-Dutch versions. Commercial promos for the show featured a different theme song, "The Geeks Get the Girls" by American Hi-Fi.

Following the second season, the American version moved to The CW, the new network formed when both The WB and UPN ceased operations in September 2006. The two-hour season premiere for the third season aired Wednesday, January 3, 2007 at 8:00 p.m. EST on The CW. The fourth season premiered on September 18, making BATG the first series to premiere for the CW for the 2007-08 television season. Beauty and the Geek was renewed for a fifth season, which premiered on March 12, 2008.

After the fifth season, the show was put on indefinite hiatus in order to stoke renewed interest in the show, and perhaps the addition of innovative twists to the format. In October 2008, casting began for a sixth season, scheduled to air on MTV, with minor celebrities as the beauties. However, a sixth season never materialized.

Season 1

Cast

Challenges and eliminations

Episode progress

 The contestants won the competition.
 The contestant won the challenge and their pair was safe from elimination.
 The contestant's partner won the challenge and they were safe from elimination.
 The contestant did not win the challenge, but their pair was safe from elimination.
 The contestant and their partner survived elimination.
 The contestant and their partner was eliminated.
 The contestant or their partner won the challenge and were also eliminated.

Season 2

Cast

Episode progress

 The contestants won the competition.
 The contestant won the challenge and their pair was safe from elimination.
 The contestant's partner won the challenge and they were safe from elimination.
 The contestant did not win the challenge but their pair was safe from elimination.
 The contestant and their partner survived elimination.
 The contestant and their partner was eliminated.

Challenges and eliminations

Season 3

Cast

Episode progress

 The contestants won the competition.
 The contestant won the challenge and their pair was safe from elimination.
 The contestant's partner won the challenge and they were safe from elimination.
 The contestant did not win the challenge but their pair was safe from elimination.
 The contestant and their partner survived elimination.
 The contestant and their partner was eliminated.

Challenges and eliminations

Season 4

Cast

Episode progress

 The contestants won the competition.
 The contestant won the challenge and their pair was safe from elimination.
 The contestant's partner won the challenge and they were safe from elimination.
 The contestant did not win the challenge but their pair was safe from elimination.
 The contestant and their partner survived elimination.
 The contestant and their partner were eliminated.

Challenges and eliminations

Season 5
Season 5 premiered on March 11, 2008, taking over the timeslot of Reaper. For the first three episodes, the beauties competed as a group against the team of geeks.  The remaining beauties and geeks then paired off to compete against the other pairs, as in previous seasons.

Cast

Note: John, Amber and Jillian were all eliminated before the teams paired. Jonathan was left without a partner and was therefore eliminated.

Episode progress
{|class="wikitable" style="text-align:center"
|-
!rowspan=2|#!!rowspan=2|Contestants !! colspan=10|Episodes
|-
! 1 !! 2 !! 3 !! 4 !! 5 !! 6 !! 7 !! 8 !! 9 !! 10
|-
! rowspan=2|1
|Amanda
| style="background:cornflowerblue;"|WIN || style="background:pink;"|RISK || style="background:cornflowerblue;"|WIN || style="background:lightblue;"|SAFE || SAFE || style="background:lightblue;"|SAFE || style="background:cornflowerblue;"|WIN || style="background:pink;"|RISK || style="background:pink;"|RISK || style="background:limegreen;"|WINNER|-
|Tommy| style="background:pink;"|RISK || style="background:cornflowerblue;"|WIN || style="background:pink;"|RISK || style="background:cornflowerblue;"|WIN || SAFE || style="background:cornflowerblue;"|WIN || style="background:cornflowerblue;"|WIN || style="background:pink;"|RISK || style="background:pink;"|RISK || style="background:limegreen;"|WINNER|-
! rowspan=2|2
|Cara
| style="background:cornflowerblue;"|WIN || SAFE || style="background:cornflowerblue;"|WIN || style="background:cornflowerblue;"|WIN || SAFE || SAFE || style="background:pink;"|RISK || style="background:lightblue;"|SAFE || style="background:pink;"|RISK || style="background:tomato;"|RUNNER-UP|-
|Chris
| style="background:pink;"|RISK || style="background:cornflowerblue;"|WIN || style="background:pink;"|RISK || style="background:lightblue;"|SAFE || SAFE || SAFE || style="background:pink;"|RISK || style="background:cornflowerblue;"|WIN || style="background:pink;"|RISK || style="background:tomato;"|RUNNER-UP|-
! rowspan=2|3
|Leticia
| style="background:cornflowerblue;"|WIN || SAFE || style="background:cornflowerblue;"|WIN || style="background:pink;"|RISK || style="background:cornflowerblue;"|WIN || SAFE || style="background:pink;"|RISK || style="background:cornflowerblue;"|WIN || style="background:tomato;"|OUT| style="background:darkgray;"|
|-
|Matt
| SAFE || style="background:cornflowerblue;"|WIN || style="background:pink;"|RISK || style="background:pink;"|RISK || style="background:cornflowerblue;"|WIN || SAFE || style="background:pink;"|RISK || style="background:lightblue;"|SAFE || style="background:tomato;"|OUT| style="background:darkgray;"|
|-
! rowspan=2|4
|Tara
| style="background:cornflowerblue;"|WIN || SAFE || style="background:cornflowerblue;"|WIN || SAFE || SAFE || style="background:pink;"|RISK || style="background:pink;"|RISK || style="background:tomato;"|OUT| style="background:darkgray;" colspan="4"|
|-
|Joe
| style="background:pink;"|RISK || style="background:cornflowerblue;"|WIN || style="background:pink;"|RISK || SAFE || SAFE || style="background:pink;"|RISK || style="background:pink;"|RISK || style="background:tomato;"|OUT| style="background:darkgray;" colspan="4"|
|-
! rowspan=2|5
|Kristina
| style="background:cornflowerblue;"|WIN || style="background:pink;"|RISK || style="background:cornflowerblue;"|WIN || SAFE || SAFE || style="background:cornflowerblue;"|WIN || style="background:tomato;"|OUT| style="background:darkgray;" colspan="5"|
|-
|Jason
| SAFE || style="background:cornflowerblue;"|WIN || style="background:pink;"|RISK || SAFE || SAFE || style="background:lightblue;"|SAFE || style="background:tomato;"|OUT| style="background:darkgray;" colspan="5"|
|-
! rowspan=2|6
|Randi
| style="background:cornflowerblue;"|WIN || style="background:pink;"|RISK || style="background:cornflowerblue;"|WIN || SAFE || SAFE || style="background:tomato;"|OUT| style="background:darkgray;" colspan="6"|
|-
|Greggy
| SAFE || style="background:cornflowerblue;"|WIN || style="background:pink;"|RISK || SAFE || SAFE || style="background:tomato;"|OUT| style="background:darkgray;" colspan="6"|
|-
! rowspan=2|7
|Tiffany
| style="background:cornflowerblue;"|WIN || SAFE || style="background:cornflowerblue;"|WIN || style="background:tomato;"|OUT| style="background:darkgray;" colspan="7"|
|-
|Jim
| SAFE || style="background:cornflowerblue;"|WIN || style="background:pink;"|RISK || style="background:tomato;"|OUT| style="background:darkgray;" colspan="7"|
|-
! rowspan|15
|Jonathan
| style="background:pink;"|RISK || style="background:cornflowerblue;"|WIN || style="background:pink;"|RISK || style="background:tomato;"|OUT| style="background:darkgray;" colspan="10"|
|-
! rowspan|16
|Jillian
| style="background:cornflowerblue;"|WIN || style="background:pink;"|RISK || style="background:tomato;"|OUT| style="background:darkgray;" colspan="10"|
|-
! rowspan|17
|Amber
| style="background:cornflowerblue;"|WIN || style="background:tomato;"|OUT| style="background:darkgray;" colspan="10"|
|-
! rowspan|18
|John
| style="background:tomato;"|OUT'| style="background:darkgray;" colspan="10"|
|}
 The contestants won the competition.
 The contestant won the challenge and their pair was safe from elimination.
 The contestant's partner won the challenge and they were safe from elimination.
 The contestant did not win the challenge but their pair was safe from elimination.
 The contestant and their partner survived elimination.
 The contestant and their partner was eliminated.

Challenges and eliminations

Contestants who appeared on other competition shows
 Richard Rubin would later appear on 1 vs 100 as a member of the mob.
 Tyson Mao appeared on Identity as a stranger.
 Megan Hauserman appeared on the second season of Rock of Love with Bret Michaels, finishing in 5th place; the first season of I Love Money, where she quit on the last episode, officially finishing in 3rd place; and Rock of Love: Charm School, getting expelled on the 4th episode.  She would later get her own dating game show: Megan Wants a Millionaire.
 Greggy Soriano competed on the first season of Cake Bosss Next Great Baker, where he was eliminated in 7th place.
 Jason Prager appeared on season 1 of The Gong Show'' revival.

References

External links 

 Beauty and the Geek (WB site)
 Beauty and the Geek (CW site)
 

2000s American reality television series
2005 American television series debuts
2008 American television series endings
20th Television franchises
American dating and relationship reality television series
English-language television shows
Nerd culture
Television duos
Television series by 20th Century Fox Television
The WB original programming
The CW original programming